Sabrang Digest was a Pakistani Urdu digest which was in circulation between 1970 and 2007

History and profile
Sabrang Digest was founded on January 1, 1970 by Shakeel Adilzada. The earliest editorial team included Shafique Hassan (editor-in-chief), Shakeel Adilzada (editor), and Hassan Hashmi (associate editor). After its first issue, Sabrang Digest made an immediate impact and its circulation reached up to 0.15 million. The digest has published stories from notable Urdu writers like, Ahmed Nadeem Qasmi, Rajinder Singh Bedi, Ilyas Sitapuri, and many others.

After being irregular in publication for some years, Sabrang eventually discontinued in 2007.

Popular story books
Sabrang published a number of popular episodic stories that have been later compiled in book form:
 Ghulam Roohein
 Aqabala
 Sona Ghaat Ka Pujari
 Inka
 Baazigar
 Ambarbail
 Sab Rang Kahaniyan

See also
 List of magazines in Pakistan

References

1970 establishments in Pakistan
2007 establishments in Pakistan
Defunct magazines published in Pakistan
Magazines established in 1970
Magazines disestablished in 2007
Monthly magazines published in Pakistan
Mass media in Karachi
Urdu-language magazines
Literary magazines published in Pakistan
Defunct literary magazines
Irregularly published magazines